Nudaria squamifera is a moth of the subfamily Arctiinae first described by George Hampson in 1914. It is found in Taiwan.

References

Nudariina